Ermeton-sur-Biert  is a village of Wallonia and a district of the municipality of Mettet, located in the province of Namur, Belgium.

There is a 14th-century castle in the village, which since 1936 has been in use as Ermeton Abbey and in 1973 was designated a heritage site.

History
The lordship of Ermeton was created in the early 14th century by John I, Marquis of Namur. The last heir to the lordship, Henry de Villermont, died in combat in 1914.

In 1903 Belgium's first union of farming women was founded at Ermeton-sur-Biert, leading to the establishment of the Cercle de Fermières at Namur in 1909.

Notable people
Marie de Villermont

References

Mettet
Former municipalities of Namur (province)